Gia sena kai gia mena (For you and for me) is a compilation album of songs written by Phoebus (music & lyrics) and Eleni Giannatsoulia (some lyrics) was released by Sony Music. It featured songs numerous Greek singers, such as Sofia Arvaniti, Katy Garbi, Thanos Kalliris, Dionysis Schinas, Pashalis Terzis, Polina, Natassa Pantelidi, Ntinos Vrettos, Petros Kolettis and Lorna.

Track listing 
"Ela kai kane mou tin Hari" (Come and do my favour) (Ntinos Vrettos-Natasa Pantelidi)
Music: Phoebus
Lyrics: Eleni Giannatsoulia
"Opos Prota" (Such as first days) (Sofia Arvaniti)
Music and Lyrics: Phoebus
"Me fernis os edo" (You send me here) (Dionysis Schinas)
Music: Phoebus
Lyrics: Eleni Giannatsoulia
"Akouo tin kardoula sou" (Remix)(I listen to your little heart-remix)
Music and Lyrics: Phoebus
Infos: The official song was released in Katy Garbi's album "Os ton Paradeiso" (1993).
Remixed by Dimitris Panopoulos
"Astatos" (Fickle-Womanizer) (Paschalis Terzis)
Music: Phoebus
Lyrics: Eleni Giannatsoulia
Infos: The song was also released in Paschalis Terzis's album "Mesogeios" (1994) and in "Afta einai ta tragoudia mou" (1996)
"Na fygeis" (Leave-Beat it) (Natasa Pantelidi)
Music and Lyrics: Phoebus
Infos: The song was also released in Natasa Pantelidi's first album "Erotas tha pei" (1995).
"Alla fantastika" (I imagined others) (Thanos Kalliris)
Music: Phoebus
Lyrics: Eleni Giannatsoulia
Infos: The song was also released in Thanos Kalliris' album "Monacha tin psyhi sou" (1996).
"Zisame" (We lived) (Katy Garbi, Dionysis Schinas)
Music and Lyrics: Phoebus
Infos: The song was also released in Dionysis Schinas's album "S'agapo" (1995) and in Katy Garbi's album "To Kati" (2000).
"Pseftroula" (Little liar) (Dionysis Schinas)
Music: Phoebus
Lyrics: Eleni Giannatsoulia
Infos: The song was official released in Dionysis Schinas's first album "Proti Agapi" (1994).
Recorded on Studio New Sound, CC Music Productions.
"Proigountai oi kyries" (Ladies first) (Polina)
Music and Lyrics: Phoebus
"An borouses" (If you could) (Lorna)
Music and Lyrics: Phoebus
"Anteho" (I resist) (Petros Koletis)
Music and Lyrics: Phoebus

1994 compilation albums